Datu Daya was a legendary tribal chief in Kandaya, the place that is now known as Daanbantayan, Cebu, in the Philippines.

According to oral tradition, Datu Daya was the leader of the first Malayan settlers in northern Cebu. The new settlers cleared forests and in a few years were able to establish a progressive community. Moro pirates continually attacked the community and kidnapped women and children until a bantayan (watchtower) was constructed to defend the town. For his leadership of the community, Datu Daya was idolized.

Cultural remnants
The town of Daanbantayan, Cebu has an annual celebration of chants and dances known as Haladaya (literally, "a tribute to Daya").

Before the conversion of the district now known as Daanbantayan into a town, it was known as Kandaya (kang Daya - Daya's place in Cebuano).

See also
 Rajah Humabon
 Lapu-lapu
 Ferdinand Magellan
 Miguel López de Legazpi
 Sri Lumay- Founder of Rajahnate of Cebu.
 Sinhapura
 Rajahnate of Cebu 
 Kedatuan of Madja-as
 Cebu City
 Cebu
 History of the Philippines (900-1521)
 Chola Dynasty

References

Filipino paramount rulers
Converts to Roman Catholicism
Filipino Roman Catholics
Filipino datus, rajas and sultans
Paramilitary Filipinos
People from Cebu
Filipino people of Malay descent
Year of birth missing
Year of death missing